Su Bingtian (born 29 August 1989) is a professional Chinese track and field athlete specializing in the 100 metres event. , he is the only sprinter of non-African descent to run the 100 m with sub-9.90 and sub-9.85, and the first ever Asian-born sprinter to break the 10-second barrier. Su's personal best of 9.83 seconds makes him the 5th fastest man all-time in the history of 100 metres at the Olympics, the 15th fastest man all-time in the history of the 100m event, and the current holder of the 100 m Asian record. Su's personal best in the 60 metres of 6.42 seconds placed him within the top six all-time in the event. 

At the 2020 Summer Olympics 100 m final, Su made history by becoming the first sprinter of non-African descent to enter Olympic 100 metres finals since 1980. En route to his 100 m personal best 9.83 at the 2020 Tokyo Olympics,  Su ran the fastest 60 m split of all-time and the fastest 60 m ever recorded under any conditions with the time of 6.29 seconds. Su was a silver medalist at the World Indoor Championships in 2018, the gold medalist at the 2018 Asian Games 100 m, a silver medalist in the  relay at the World Relays in 2015, and a bronze medalist in the  relay at the 2020 Summer Olympics.

Early life
Su was born on 29 August 1989, in Zhongshan village, Guangdong province, China. His parents are both poor peasants who farmed their family lands in 1980s China. Even after Su later achieved national renown, his father continued to work as a security guard and his mother worked as a nanny. His middle school didn't have any specialized sprint coach but a PE teacher. Even so, he was a back-up sprinter doing mostly managerial preparatory work for the track team throughout and didn't get to compete until 9th grade. Despite not having formal training, he ran a time (11.72) just 0.01 seconds slower than the best sprinter in the city district. Su was passed on and deemed an untalented sprinter in numerous occasions by the coaches of the city-level track and field team. 

It was also during middle school that Su met his life-long best friend and love of his life Yanfang Lin whom he later married.

Career

Early career
Su's career started with his entry into the Guangdong provincial track and field team in China, known for its history of producing outstanding national-level Chinese short distance sprinters and warm weather year-round which is conducive to outdoor track training. His first professional track coach and mentor Yuan Guoqiang was the first Chinese 100m national record holder in the early 80s at the start of digital-timing era and was a short (5'6) sprinter himself. When Su's admittance into Guangdong Dong track and field team was met with initial resistance by other coaches, Yuan Guoqiang took special notice of Su's personality, stride frequency and stride tempo, whom other coaches easily passed on and overlooked for his supposed lack of talent due to Su's short stature at the time. According to Yuan, Su was "methodical, professional, absolutely concentrated, and an intelligent runner. Few athletes I coached was as committed as he was to the sports". 

Su broke onto the continental scene with three straight wins in the 100 metres on the Asian Grand Prix series in May 2009. His first medal came in the 4×100 metres relay at the 11th Chinese Games later that year, where he helped the Guangdong team including Liang Jiahong and Wen Yongyi to the gold medal.

He also began representing China internationally that year and shortly after the national games he won the gold medal over 60 metres at the 2009 Asian Indoor Games, running a personal best of 6.65 seconds. He was selected for the relay at the 2009 Asian Athletics Championships and won a silver medal alongside Guo Fan, Liang Jiahong and Zhang Peimeng. He took the individual 100 m title at the East Asian Games, defeating Japanese rival Shintaro Kimura.

He equalled the Chinese indoor record in the 60 m in Chengdu in 2010, running 6.58 seconds. At the 2010 Asian Games he won the relay gold with a national and Games record time.

During March 2011, Su set a new Chinese national 60 metres indoor record in Chengdu with a time of 6.56 seconds. He went on to establish himself as his country's top male sprinter that year: he won the 100 m title at the 2011 Asian Athletics Championships in a personal best of 10.21 seconds, was the bronze medalist at the 2011 Summer Universiade, then competed at the 2011 World Championships in Athletics in Daegu (running in the heats of the relay). He ended the season by breaking the Chinese record to win the 100 m at the Chinese Athletics Championships with a time of 10.16 seconds, improving upon Zhou Wei and Chen Haijian's former best mark.

In 2012, Su qualified for the 2012 IAAF World Indoor Championships, marking his first participation in an indoor IAAF World Championships. Su subsequently reached the semi-final of the 60m at the 2012 IAAF World Indoor Championships. Later that year, Su also became a 100 m semi-finalist at the 2012 Summer Olympics. He ran a wind-aided (+2.9 m/s) 10.04 seconds at the start of the outdoor season and ended it by defending his national title in the 100 m. With the Chinese relay team he ran national records twice that season, timing 38.71 seconds in May and improving to 38.38 seconds with Guo Fan, Liang Jiahong and Zhang Peimeng in the heats of the Olympics.

His 2013 began with two 60 m national records in Nanjing, where he ran 6.56 seconds and then 6.55 seconds. Zhang Peimeng beat Su's 100 m national record in May 2013, but Su quickly responded with a personal best of 10.06 seconds at the IAAF World Challenge Beijing.

Later that year, Su qualified for the 2013 IAAF World Championships, marking his first participation in an outdoor IAAF World Championships in an individual event. On 10 August 2013, Su raced in the sixth heat of the first round in the 100 metres, subsequently qualifying to the semi-finals by clocking 10.16 seconds. The following day, he was drawn into the first semi-final against former world champion Justin Gatlin. Su was disqualified in the race due to his false start, thereby rendering him unable to progress to the finals. Su's compatriot Zhang Peimeng also once again replaced Su as the 100 m national record holder, by clocking a time of 10.00 seconds in the semi-finals of the 2013 IAAF World Championships.

2014
Starting from 2014, Su Bingtian was part of the Chinese Track and Field initiative led by its national head coach Yuan Guoqiang (Su's early mentor and provincial coach in Guangdong Track and Field team) that 1）sent its top track athletes to USA for more systematic and scientific training in order to be competitive internationally 2) hired competent foreign track coaches to coach locally at China. 
They trained at the IMF Academy Track & Field and Cross Country located at Florida. Su's aim was to break 10 second barrier through participating in this initiative. 

It was  through this initiative that Su first met his later mentor and coach Randy Huntington, who was responsible for coaching Chinese national team of long jumpers at the time in China. Their encounter was not pre-planned. It was by coincidence that Randy Huntington chanced upon Su's training nearby. Su's decision to change his starting leg was a reaction to Randy Huntington's suggestion. Randy performed a test on Su by pushing him randomly when he was not prepared, and the first step Su took in reaction to this push was taken by his right one. Randy suggested he changed his starting leg to the right one for that would fit Su's natural neurological pattern better.The aim was to change his entire 100m pace and allow him suffer from less de-acceleration after the first 60m while maintaining his advantage at explosive start in the first half of the race. At the beginning of his transition to change starting leg, Su was for a time even slower out of block than a female sprinter when he trained at IMF Academy after he returned to USA. His first 60m race after implementing the change was only 6.71 and his 100m best was 10.80.

Yuan Guoqiang said that Su was so obsessed with perfecting his start at the time that he would work on his block start even when he was taking a walk, woke up in the middle of the night and contemplated why he couldn't perform the move as well as other world class athletes, and he would proceed to discuss the matter with his teammate Xie Zhenye.

2015

On May 30, 2015, at the Prefontaine Classic in Eugene, Oregon, Su clocked a historic 9.99 seconds in the 100 m, becoming the first Asian-born sprinter to achieve a sub-10 second clocking. Su's historic sub-10 second clocking allowed him once again to regain the 100 m national record from compatriot Zhang Peimeng, ending their national record 'tug-of-war' which had begun in 2013. Su's coach Yuan Guoqiang later stated that: "Zhang Peimeng's 10.00 national record set at the World Championships in Moscow has given him (Su) more courage; it convinced him (Su) even more that a sub-10 clocking was not an impossible mission for Chinese athletes."

Later that year, Su qualified for the 2015 IAAF World Championships which were held in his home country of China. On 22 August 2015, Su raced in the first heat of the first round of the 100 metres finishing second behind Asafa Powell in 10.03 seconds. The following day, he was drawn in the first semi-final against defending champion Usain Bolt. Su finished in fourth clocking a time of 9.986 seconds tying Jimmy Vicaut's time in the third semi-final; since they were tied for the eighth-fastest time, they were both entered into the final, marking the first-ever nine-man final in World Championship history. Su then raced in the final, finishing 9th with a time of 10.06 seconds. Su subsequently became the first ever Asian-born athlete to run in a 100 m World Championship final.

On 29 August 2015, Su raced with his teammates Mo Youxue, Xie Zhenye and Zhang Peimeng in the 4 × 100 metres relay. Running the third leg, Su aided his team to a third-place finish in the heats, qualifying them for the final with a then Asian record time of 37.92 seconds. In the final, the Chinese team crossed the line in third behind the United States and Jamaica in 38.01 seconds, giving them a Bronze Medal finish. However, subsequent disqualification of the United States due to improper baton exchange meant that the Chinese team were promoted to a Silver medal finish in the Bird's Nest Stadium; with their Bronze being awarded to Canada.

2016

With his eyes on the 2016 Summer Olympics, Su began the year by running the 60 metres at various indoor meets in the US, ultimately qualifying for the 2016 IAAF World Indoor Championships in Portland, Oregon. On March 18, 2016, Su won his 60 metres heat at the championships with a time of 6.64 seconds. Later in the day, Su finished second in his semi-final clocking 6.50 seconds; a new personal best and equalling the Asian record. He went on to finish fifth in the final with a time of 6.54 seconds.

Outdoors, Su ran only three meets before the Olympics. He and his teammates ran and won two 4 x 100 metre relay races in his home country of China; one in Shanghai at the Shanghai Golden Grand Prix; and one in Beijing at the IAAF World Challenge Beijing. On May 26, 2016, Su finished seventh in 100 metres at the 2016 Prefontaine Classic in a wind-aided 10.04 seconds, unable to repeat the success he had on the same track the year before.

Su arrived in Rio de Janeiro for the Olympic Games, having qualified for the 100 metres and the 4 × 100 metres relay. In the 100 metres, Su finished third in his heat in 10.17 seconds, qualifying him as one of the fastest losers for the semi-final. The following day, on August 14, 2016, Su finished fourth in his semi-final in 10.08 seconds; a season's best time. However, his time was unable to qualify him for the final. 4 days later, on August 18, 2016, Su raced with his teammates Tang Xingqiang, Xie Zhenye and Zhang Peimeng in the heats of the 4 × 100 metre relay. Running the third leg, Su helped his team to a second-place finish in their heat behind the United States. Their time of 37.82 seconds set a new Asian record for the event. The following day, the Chinese team finished fourth in the final following a disqualification by team USA, narrowly missing out on an Olympic medal. Su ended his season after the Olympics.

2017

On 27 May 2017, Su once again achieved a sub-10 second time in the 100 m at the 2017 Prefontaine Classic with a personal best 9.92 seconds. However, the tailwind (+2.4 m/s) was above the allowed limit of 2.0 m/s, invalidating the time as an official national record or personal best.

Later that year, Su qualified for the 2017 IAAF World Championships. On 4 August 2017, Su raced in the fourth heat of the first round in the 100 metres subsequently qualifying to the semi-finals by clocking 10.03 seconds. The following day, he was drawn in the second semi-final against former world champion Yohan Blake. Su finished in third clocking a time of 10.10 seconds putting him through to the final where he subsequently finished 8th with a time of 10.27 seconds.

2018

Various stellar performances by Su Bingtian in 2018 made it a historically significant year for Chinese athletics.

On 3 March 2018, Su made history by becoming the first male Chinese sprinter to win an individual IAAF World Indoor Championships medal, as he took silver in the 2018 edition's men's 60 metres final. Su's 6.42 second performance in the event made him the current holder of the 60 m Asian record; it also places Su within the top 5 of all-time 60 metres performances.

On 22 June 2018, Su took gold in the men's 100 metres final of the 2018 IAAF World Challenge meet in Madrid with a historic 9.91 seconds; tying the Asian record previously set by Nigerian-born Qatari Femi Ogunode. Su's result of 9.91 seconds also simultaneously allowed him to regain his 100 m national record which compatriot Xie Zhenye had broken only three days earlier with a time of 9.97 seconds. One week later, Su continued his fantastic form by equalling his 9.91-second Asian record at the 2018 Meeting de Paris.

On 26 August 2018, Su won the gold medal in the men's 100 metres event at the 2018 Asian Games. He won the event with a time of 9.92 seconds breaking the Asian Games record previously set by Femi Ogunode at the 2014 Asian Games.

Representing team Asia-Pacific, Su capped of his record-breaking year with a silver medal in the 2018 IAAF Continental Cup men's 100 m final. Su finished 0.02 seconds behind team Americas representative Noah Lyles, with a time of 10.03 seconds.

Reflecting on his 2018 performances, Su remarked the following: "It is really a miraculous and amazing year for me, the most memorable one in my career. I achieved a series of good results, and most importantly, I made such results in competing with the best sprinters in the world, which was quite a boost to my confidence."

2019
At the end of 2018, Su made it known that his sights were now set on breaking the 9.90 second barrier in the 100 m as his primary goal for 2019.

On 14 February 2019, Su started the year out strong with a 60m victory at the 2019 AIT International Grand Prix, clocking a stadium-record time of 6.52 seconds. Two days later, Su quickly followed up his good form with a resounding 60m victory at the Birmingham meet of the 2019 IAAF World Indoor Tour. The winning time was clocked at 6.47 seconds beating out rivals Reece Prescod and Mike Rodgers to the gold.

At the 2019 IAAF World Relays, Su raced with his teammates Wu Zhiqiang, Xie Zhenye and Liang Jinsheng in the 4 × 100 metres relay. Running the third leg, Su aided his teammates to a second-place finish in the heats, qualifying them for the final with a time of 38.51 seconds. In the final, the Chinese team crossed the line in a season's best 38.16 seconds, subsequently missing out on a bronze medal finish by just 0.01 seconds.

2021
On 1 August 2021, Su clocked a time of 9.827 seconds to win his heat of the 2020 Summer Olympics  men's 100 m semi-finals, thereby setting a new Asian record and becoming the second Asian sprinter to have ever qualified for a men's 100 metres Olympic final, after Takayoshi Yoshioka at the 1932 Summer Olympics and the first Asian to qualify for 100m Olympic Final since the start of the digital timing era. Between 1980 and 2020, Su is the only sprinter of non-African descent to ever make Olympic 100m Men's Finals in a span of 40 years. In the semi-finals Su was placed ahead of eventual gold-medalist Marcell Jacobs and also achieved the fastest time ever recorded for 60m-split with 6.29 seconds, also the fastest 60m all-time under any conditions surpassing both Usain Bolt's prior record of 6.31 seconds for 60m split in his 100 m world record run and Christian Coleman's 6.34 official indoor world record. Su's 9.83 also placed him among the top 5 fastest men in the history of Olympic 100m races ranking just behind Usain Bolt, Yohan Blake, Justin Gatlin, and Marcel Jacobs. Su subsequently went on to achieve a sixth place finish in the final with 9.98 seconds. He and his teammates also qualified for the final of the men's 4×100 m relay and finished fourth in that race in 37.79 seconds, equalling the Chinese national record set in 2019. On 18 February 2022, Great Britain was stripped of its silver medal in the men's 4×100 m relay after the Court of Arbitration for Sport confirmed CJ Ujah’s doping violation. Su and his teammates were subsequently promoted to a bronze medal position.

Personal life

Education
In 2017, Su graduated with a master's degree from the International Economics and Trade from the College of Economics at Jinan University. In April 2018, Su was officially appointed as an associate professor of the School of Physical Education at Jinan University.

Family
Su is a native of Guzhen, Guangdong, China. On October 10, 2017, Su Bingtian wed his childhood sweetheart Lin Yanfang. The wedding ceremony was held in Guzhen, Guangdong, a town close to where Su and Lin grew up. In the early morning of July 11, 2018, their son was born.

Outside athletics
On December 20, 2017, Su was elected as one of Zhongshan City's representatives for the 13th People's Congress of Guangdong Province.

As the representative for Chinese athletes, Su attended 'The 3rd Olympic Council of Asia (OCA) Athletes’ Forum' held in Tokyo, Japan from 24–25 November 2018.

Charitable activities
On September 19, 2015, Su led dozens of school students on Ersha Island to help with fundraising activities for the Chinese charity "Walking for Love". The money raised for "Walking For Love" was intended to be used for the promotion of children's reading skills.

On November 10, 2015, Su visited various Guangzhou Power Supply power grid substations to help conduct on-site measurements. Su also undertook power grid construction work to provide electricity to an elderly man's home. Su's visit came after a typhoon incident in Guangzhou where Guangzhou Power Supply grid workers managed to fix power grids within only 5 hours of going down. After the visit, Su commented that "the existence and construction of the power grid required the collective support of everyone".

Statistics
Information from World Athletics profile unless otherwise noted.

Personal bests

International championship results

Circuit wins
Outdoor
Diamond League (Event in parenthesis)
Shanghai: 2016 (100 m), 2017 ( relay)
Monaco: 2017 ( relay)

Indoor
World Indoor Tour (60 m)
Overall winner: 2018
Karlsruhe: 2018
Düsseldorf: 2018, 2019
Glasgow: 2018
Birmingham: 2019

National championship results

Sub-10 seconds 100 metres record
Su Bingtian has broken the 10-second barrier in the 100 metres on 13 occasions, with 10 of those occasions being under the allowable wind velocity of +2.0 m/s for record purposes. His first sub-10 clocking was on 30 May 2015 at the Prefontaine Classic in 9.99 seconds with a legal +1.5 m/s wind reading, setting a Chinese record and making him the first athlete of either Chinese or eastern Asian descent to break the 10-second barrier. He improved his personal best and the Chinese record on 22 June 2018 at the Meeting Madrid to 9.91 seconds, equaling the Asian record set by Nigerian-born Qatari sprinter Femi Ogunode, and further improved all three of these records on 1 August 2021 by clocking 9.83 seconds to win his semifinal heat at the 2020 Summer Olympics in Tokyo.

Seasonal bests

References

External links

Living people
1989 births
Chinese male sprinters
People from Zhongshan
Cantonese people
Athletes (track and field) at the 2010 Asian Games
Athletes (track and field) at the 2014 Asian Games
Athletes (track and field) at the 2018 Asian Games
Asian Games medalists in athletics (track and field)
Athletes (track and field) at the 2012 Summer Olympics
Athletes (track and field) at the 2016 Summer Olympics
Athletes (track and field) at the 2020 Summer Olympics
Olympic athletes of China
Athletes from Guangdong
Jinan University alumni
World Athletics Championships athletes for China
World Athletics Championships medalists
World Athletics Indoor Championships medalists
Asian Games gold medalists for China
Asian Games silver medalists for China
Asian Games bronze medalists for China
Medalists at the 2010 Asian Games
Medalists at the 2014 Asian Games
Medalists at the 2018 Asian Games
Universiade medalists in athletics (track and field)
Universiade bronze medalists for China
Runners from Guangdong
Asian Games gold medalists in athletics (track and field)
Medalists at the 2011 Summer Universiade
Medalists at the 2020 Summer Olympics
Olympic bronze medalists for China
Olympic bronze medalists in athletics (track and field)